The play-offs of the 2018 Fed Cup Asia/Oceania Zone Group II were the final stages of the Group II Zonal Competition involving teams from Asia and Oceania. Using the positions determined in their pools, the fourteen teams faced off to determine their placing in the 2018 Fed Cup Asia/Oceania Zone Group II. The top team advanced to Asia/Oceania Group I in 2019.

Pool results

Promotional play-offs 
The first placed teams of the pools were drawn in head-to-head rounds. The winners advanced to the Asia/Oceania Group I in 2019.

Uzbekistan vs. Indonesia

Singapore vs. Pacific Oceania

5th to 8th play-offs
The second placed teams of the pools were drawn in head-to-head rounds to find the fifth to eighth placed teams.

New Zealand vs. Pakistan

Philippines vs. Oman

9th to 12th play-offs
The third placed teams of the pools were drawn in head-to-head rounds to find the ninth to twelfth placed teams.

Lebanon vs. Sri Lanka

Kyrgyzstan vs. Malaysia

Final placements 

See also 
 Fed Cup structure

References

External links 
 Fed Cup website

P2